Craig John Coughlin (born January 31, 1958) is an American Democratic Party politician, who has represented the 19th Legislative District in the New Jersey General Assembly since 2010. He has served as the Speaker of the New Jersey General Assembly since 2018.

Early life 
Born in Perth Amboy, New Jersey, Coughlin grew up in South Amboy and graduated from South Amboy Middle High School in 1976. Coughlin received a B.S. degree in 1980 from St. John's University and a J.D. degree in 1983 from St. John's University School of Law.

He served on the Board of Education of the South Amboy Public Schools from 1983 to 1987. In 1987 he was elected to the South Amboy City Council, serving until 1993. He worked as an attorney before serving as a municipal court judge for Edison Township in 2005.

Controversy 
In 2016, shortly after attaining the position of Assembly Speaker, Coughlin formed the law firm Rainone Coughlin Minchello. Coughlin's firm includes four other attorneys who had worked for Decotiis FitzPatrick & Cole LLP, providing legal services to municipal and county governments totaling $14 million in FY2016. As of 2017, Coughlin's firm secured contracts with dozens of local municipalities totaling over $1 million.

Coughlin's law firm currently provides for-profit legal counsel to the Middlesex County Improvement Authority, and has recently acquired a $150,000 public contract with North Brunswick to fulfill the position of Municipal Attorney.

The Middlesex County Improvement Authority was awarded a $70 million contract by NJ Transit to manage the North Brunswick Train station project. In a statement made to Bloomberg News, Coughlin denies any conflicts of interest or "involvement with respect to Middlesex County’s or the improvement authority’s discussions with the state concerning North Brunswick transit village and never had any intention of performing any work in connection with this project."

New Jersey Assembly 
He resigned from the court in 2009 to run for the General Assembly seat vacated by Joseph Vas, after the Democratic candidate, South Amboy Mayor John O'Leary, dropped out of the race. On September 8, 2009, a special convention of Middlesex County Democratic Committee members selected Coughlin to appear on the general election ballot along with running mate John Wisniewski.

Coughlin won the general election and was sworn into office on January 12, 2010. On November 13, 2017, was selected by the Assembly Democratic Conference to be Speaker of the Assembly starting in January 2018 when the new legislative term begins.

Committees 
Legislative Services Commission

District 19 
Each of the 40 districts in the New Jersey Legislature has one representative in the New Jersey Senate and two members in the New Jersey General Assembly. The representatives from the 19th District for the 2022—23 Legislative Session are:
Senator Joseph Vitale (D), 
Assemblyman Craig Coughlin (D), and 
Assemblyman Yvonne Lopez

Electoral history

References

External links 
Assemblyman Coughlin's legislative webpage, New Jersey Legislature

|-

1958 births
21st-century American politicians
Living people
New Jersey city council members
New Jersey lawyers
People from Perth Amboy, New Jersey
People from South Amboy, New Jersey
People from Woodbridge Township, New Jersey
School board members in New Jersey
Speakers of the New Jersey General Assembly
Democratic Party members of the New Jersey General Assembly
St. John's University School of Law alumni